Middle Eastern Studies is a bimonthly peer-reviewed academic journal of Middle-Eastern studies. It was established in 1964 by Elie Kedourie, who served as editor-in-chief from 1964–1992, and is published by Taylor & Francis. From 1992–2016, the journal was edited by Sylvia Kedourie. It is now co-edited by Saul Kelly and Helen Kedourie.

Abstracting and indexing
The journal is abstracted and indexed in:

According to the Journal Citation Reports, the journal has a 2016 impact factor of 0.443.

References

External links
 

Area studies journals
Bimonthly journals
Taylor & Francis academic journals
Publications established in 1964
English-language journals